Tom Clurey (born 23 March 1994) is a professional Australian rules footballer playing for the Port Adelaide Football Club in the Australian Football League (AFL). He was drafted by Port Adelaide with the 29th selection in the Australian Football League's (AFL) 2012 National Draft from Murray Bushrangers in the TAC Cup.

Clurey is a tall defender that is known for his endurance, this was shown in the NAB AFL combine where he recorded a beep test result of 15.1, which set him apart from all other tall defenders at the camp. Originally from a sheep and canola farm in the township of Invergordon, near Shepparton, he made his AFL debut in round 1, 2014, against Carlton.

Clurey took a developmental step forward in 2015, playing 8 games at AFL level and improving his consistency in the SANFL. He broke through mid year to play 8 out of 10 games, covering for injuries to Alipate Carlile and Jackson Trengove. He predominantly played on the second or third tall and beat the likes of Jesse White, Patrick Ambrose, Stewart Crameri and Jeremy Howe during the year. Impressive with the ball, he became a safe user coming out of the backline, where his intercept marking and 3rd up spoiling was also a feature.

References

External links

Living people
1994 births
Port Adelaide Football Club players
Port Adelaide Football Club players (all competitions)
Glenelg Football Club players
Australian rules footballers from Victoria (Australia)
Murray Bushrangers players